Denis William Anson Marshall  (born 23 September 1943) is a former New Zealand politician. He was an MP from 1984 to 1999, representing the National Party, and a Government Minister until 1996. His Ministerial career ended when he resigned about six months after the release of the Commission of Inquiry report into the Cave Creek Disaster, and a year after the accident itself in which 14 people died and a further four were seriously injured, and during which time he was Minister of Conservation. He had been under pressure to resign since the report's release.

Early life
Born in Marton on 23 September 1943, Marshall was educated at Norwood School, Gisborne, Hereworth School, Havelock North, Christ's College, Christchurch and Lincoln College as part of the Kellogg New Zealand Rural Leadership Programme and was a Nuffield Farming Scholar to the United Kingdom 1983.

In 1965, he married Mary Annette Kilmister, and the couple went on to have three children.

Member of Parliament

Marshall was a member of the New Zealand House of Representatives from 1984 to 1999. Having joined the National Party in the 1970s, he was first elected to Parliament for Rangitikei in the 1984 election, defeating Social Credit Party leader Bruce Beetham. He held the seat against Beetham in the 1987 election, and retained it until his retirement at the 1999 election.

Cabinet minister
Marshall served in a number of Ministerial roles, beginning in 1993 and ending in 1996. He was Minister of Lands, Valuation, Department of Survey Land & Information from 1993 to 1996, and Minister of Forestry in 1996. Other notable positions between 1997 and 1999 include Chairman of the Parliamentary Select Committee on Transport and Environment Committee, Chairman of Special Select Committee on Dairy Industry Restructuring, and Producer Boarder Reform.

Minister of Conservation
Denis Marshall's best known post was as Minister of Conservation from 1990 to 1996 during which he also acted as Associate Minister of Agriculture and Associate Minister of Employment. He resigned from his role as a minister in May 1996, roughly a year following the April 1995 Cave Creek disaster in which 14 people died. A commission of inquiry found that whilst many individual mistakes contributed to the accident, a root cause was that the Department of Conservation had been under-funded and under-resourced for the role it was expected to achieve, and from the time of its creation in 1987 it had remained disorganised internally with few consistently used project and safety management systems, or formally qualified staff for much of the required work. Intense scrutiny of the Minister followed, as well as scrutiny of the government's funding priorities.

He did not resign immediately following the release of the report, claiming that his resignation would not remedy the situation, and citing a quotation of Sir Geoffrey Palmer which stated that ministers weren't personally responsible for everything done in their name, as they could not be expected to know or authorise everything that occurred. Criticism that he had been the Minister of Conservation for five years during which time it had remained in a disorganised state, however, eventually ended with his resignation about six months later.

Life after politics
Marshall retired from Parliament in 1999, and moved to London. He took up a full-time post as Secretary-General at the Commonwealth Parliamentary Association (CPA) from January 2002 to December 2006.

He has been consulting to the UNDP and the WBI over the past four years.

He now lives in Queenstown, Central Otago, New Zealand where he is a vigneron of his own vineyard Hawkshead Wine and producer of pinot noir, pinot gris, riesling and sauvignon blanc.

Community
In 2000 he founded the NZ National Parks and Conservation Foundation following his strong belief that there needed to be an opportunity for the private sector and corporate world to contribute more to conservation in New Zealand. He was the foundation's inaugural chairman from 2000 to 2001.

He was the chairman of the New Zealand Rural Communities Trust from 2000 to 2001.

He is a member in numerous community organisations in NZ such NZ Historic Places Trust and Royal Forest and Bird Protection Society.

Honours
In 1990, Marshall was awarded the New Zealand 1990 Commemoration Medal. In the 2000 New Year Honours, he was appointed a Companion of the Queen's Service Order for public services.

References

External links
Denis Marshall's website
National Parks and Conservation Foundation
Dawn Chorus
Executive Government Archive website
Commonwealth Parliamentary Association
 World Bank Organisation
NZ Herald Article

1943 births
Living people
People from Marton, New Zealand
Members of the Cabinet of New Zealand
New Zealand farmers
New Zealand National Party MPs
People educated at Christ's College, Christchurch
Members of the New Zealand House of Representatives
Companions of the Queen's Service Order
New Zealand MPs for North Island electorates
Lincoln University (New Zealand) alumni
21st-century New Zealand politicians